The discography of Scottish rock band The View consists of five studio albums, three EPs, one compilation album and seventeen singles.

Studio albums

Compilation albums

Extended plays

Singles

References

Rock music group discographies
Discographies of British artists